The Old Clovis Post Office at 4th and Mitchell Sts. in Clovis, New Mexico is a former post office built in 1931.  It includes elements of  
Classical Revival and Mission/Spanish Revival architecture.  It has also served as the Clovis-Carver Public Library.

It is a two-story building with a hipped and flat roof, built on an ashlar sandstone basement.  It has various tan shades of brick in its walls and its roof is light-brown and orange tile.

The building is significant as a public works project during the Great Depression.

It was built in the same year as the Hotel Clovis, which is also NRHP-listed.

References

National Register of Historic Places in Curry County, New Mexico
Neoclassical architecture in New Mexico
Mission Revival architecture in New Mexico
Government buildings completed in 1931
Clovis, New Mexico
Post office buildings on the National Register of Historic Places in New Mexico